The 2012 Austrian Darts Open was the first of five PDC European Tour events on the 2012 PDC Pro Tour. The tournament took place at the Arena Nova in Wiener Neustadt near Vienna, Austria, from 27–29 April 2012. It featured a field of 64 players and £82,100 in prize money, with £15,000 going to the winner.

Justin Pipe won the title, by defeating James Wade 6–3 in the final. Michael Smith and Simon Whitlock both threw nine-dart finishes during the tournament.

Prize money

Qualification
The top 32 players from the PDC Order of Merit automatically qualified for the event. The remaining 32 places went to players from three qualifying events - 20 from the UK Qualifier (held in Barnsley on 13 April), eight from the European Qualifier (held in Cologne on 7 April) and four from the Host Nation Qualifier (held in Eisenstadt on 31 March).

1–32

UK Qualifier
  Mick Todd (first round)
  Mark Dudbridge (second round)
  Scott Rand (first round)
  Johnny Haines (first round)
  Gaz Cousins (second round)
  Prakash Jiwa (first round)
  Steve Evans (second round)
  Jim Walker (second round)
  Ian White (first round)
  William O'Connor (first round)
  Joe Cullen (quarter-finals)
  John Scott (first round)
  James Richardson (quarter-finals)
  Dean Winstanley (third round)
  Michael Smith (second round)
  Brian Woods (first round)
  Ross Smith (first round)
  Richie Howson (first round)
  Arron Monk (first round)
  Darren Webster (first round)

European Qualifier
  Gino Vos (second round)
  Mareno Michels (first round)
  Roland Scholten (first round)
  Kim Huybrechts (third round)
  Michael van Gerwen (third round)
  Michael Rosenauer (first round)
  Boris Krčmar (first round)
  Jelle Klaasen (first round)

Host Nation Qualifier
  Mensur Suljović (first round)
  Zoran Lerchbacher (first round)
  Dietmar Burger (first round)
  Martin Kurecka (first round)

Draw

References

2012 PDC European Tour
2012 in Austrian sport